Philippe Cadorette (born April 7, 1995) is a Canadian ice hockey goaltender. He is currently playing for the Norfolk Admirals of the ECHL.

Cadorette played major junior hockey with the Baie-Comeau Drakkar of the Quebec Major Junior Hockey League (QMJHL). Cadorette, who has played in the QMJHL since the 2011–12 season, was rewarded for his outstanding play when he was named to the 2013–14 QMJHL First All-Star Team.

After his junior career in the QMJHL in the 2014–15 season, Cadorette initially signed an amateur try-out contract with the Wheeling Nailers of the ECHL on April 25, 2015, however only trained with the club.

On August 6, 2015, Cadorette signed his first professional contract in agreeing to a one-year contract with the Norfolk Admirals of the ECHL, a secondary affiliate of the Edmonton Oilers.

Awards and honours

References

External links 

1995 births
Living people
Baie-Comeau Drakkar players
Canadian ice hockey goaltenders
French Quebecers
Ice hockey people from Quebec
Norfolk Admirals (ECHL) players
Sportspeople from Saint-Hyacinthe